Sir Basil Firebrace, 1st Baronet (1652 – 7 May 1724) was a supplier of wines to the royal household, Sheriff of London, and MP for Chippenham, Wiltshire, from 1690 to 1692. He was prosecuted for fraud and bribery, acquitted, and created a baronet in 1698.

Early life
Firebrace was the second son of Sir Henry Firebrace, a courtier to both Charles I and Charles II, and Elizabeth Dowell; he was born in 1652.

Career
Firebrace became a vintner and supplier of wines to the royal household. He went into partnership with Samuel Shepheard. He was Sheriff of London in 1687, and knighted; he was also appointed Colonel of the Orange Regiment of the London militia. He was admitted into the Worshipful Company of Vintners the following year and became an Alderman for Billingsgate.

He was elected MP for Chippenham as a Tory on 9 December 1690, but the election was declared void almost a year later, on 1 December 1691, and was re-run on 14 December. He again won but an election petition unseated him in favour of Thomas Tollemache on 22 January 1692. In 1694 he purchased West Lodge, Enfield Chase, where he resided until 1716.

Firebrace also became a prominent figure in the East India Company and was imprisoned in the Tower of London by Parliament for bribery and fraud in relation to its activities. In April 1695 the House of Lords ordered that he be kept in "close confinement", having no contact with other prisoners. He was perhaps more of a go-between than a principal, and although criticised for his entrepreneurialism, he was eventually acquitted of all charges.

He was appointed 1st Baronet Firebrace in 1698 by King William III., was bankrupted in 1701 and again imprisoned, for stabbing a creditor.

Marriage and family
He married Elizabeth, the daughter of merchant Thomas Hough on 7 September 1671, at St Margaret's, Westminster.

They produced five children, two of whom, Basil and Thomas, died in infancy. Of the survivors, Hester (c. 1675- c.1725) married Basil Feilding, 4th Earl of Denbigh, Charles (1680–1727) later inherited the baronetcy and their final child, George, was born in 1681.

Firebrace died on 7 May 1724; W. H. Auden was among his descendants.

Notes

References

Kidd, Charles, Williamson, David (editors). Debrett's Peerage and Baronetage (1990 edition). New York: St Martin's Press, 1990, 

1652 births
1724 deaths
Baronets in the Baronetage of England
English MPs 1690–1695
Sheriffs of the City of London
People from Wiltshire
Prisoners in the Tower of London
People from Billingsgate
British East India Company people
Members of the Parliament of Great Britain for Chippenham